Club des Belugas is a nu jazz and lounge group from Germany. The core of Club des Belugas consists of Maxim Illion and Kitty the Bill; they are supported by various featured and guest musicians including Reiner Winterschladen, Mickey Neher, Brenda Boykin and Ester Rada.
In addition to acoustic instruments, synthesizers are often used. The music is influenced by jazz, soul, Latin, electro swing and lounge.

History 
The project was founded in 2002 in Wuppertal. The first album was released in the same year, Caviar at 3 a.m., followed by Minority Tunes in 2003. In 2006 the third album Apricoo Soul followed. It included a remix of the Dean Martin version of "Mambo Italiano", which was authorized by Capitol Records / EMI and Martin's family. Two years later, in 2008, SWOP was released, the following year Zoo Zizaro which includes their remix of Ella Fitzgerald's version of "Air Mail Special". In 2012 Forward was released with a single, "Save a Little Love for Me".  In 2013 the album The ChinChin Sessions was released, which was created in collaboration with the Mannheim trumpeter Thomas Siffling.

Club des Belugas has released their albums Forward and The ChinChin Sessions (as of 2013) on the label Chinchin Records; previously they were under contract with Artcore Music.

Club des Belugas has given over 280 live concerts all over the world.  Between June and September 2007, the band went on a concert tour through the People's Republic of China.

Recordings including "Hip Hip Chin Chin" and "Gadda Rio" (both on the album Minority Tunes) reached the top 10 on the German club charts in 2003. In total, pieces by the band were distributed on more than four million records, including not only CDs by the band themselves, but also on more than 1900 compilations.

Their music has been featured on TV shows including Live to Dance, So You Think You Can Dance (American TV series) and Dancing with the Stars (American season 7).  Major companies have used their music in commercials.

Band members

Main members 
 Maxim Illion – Keyboard, Bass & Percussion
 Kitty the Bill – Keyboard

Featured and guest members 
 Bajka
 Karlos Boes
 Brenda Boykin – Vocals
 Maya Fadeeva
 Anna Luca – Vocals
 Iain Mackenzie – Vocals
 Ferank Manseed
 Lene Riebau
 Anne Schnell – Vocals
 Thomas Siffling
 Ashley Slater

Discography 
Albums
 2002 – Caviar at 3 a.m.
 2003 – Minority tunes
 2006 – Apricoo Soul
 2008 – SWOP
 2009 – Zoo Zizaro
 2011 – Live
 2012 – Forward
 2014 – Fishing for Zebras
 2016 – Nine
 2018 – Club des Belugas & Thomas Siffling – Ragbag
 2019 – Strange Things Beyond The Sunny Side
 2021 – That's My Style
 2021 – How to Avoid Difficult Situations

Singles
 2007 – "Wildcats & Dibidy Dop"
 2007 – "Hip Hip Chin Chin" (EP)
 2012 – "Save a Little Love for Me"
 2014 – "Straight to Memphis"
 2014 – "Iko Iko" (feat. Brenda Boykin)
 2016 – "It's Only Music" (feat. Ashley Slater)
 2016 – "Hip Hip Chin Chin" (Schizoid Sista Remixes)
 2016 – "Pogo Porn" (feat. Karlos Boes)
 2016 – "Bye-Bye Baby I Won't Come Back"
 2018 – "Double A"
 2019 – "Don't Look Back"
 2020 – "Get Get On"
 2020 – "Mondo Mas"
 2021 – "That's My Style" (feat. Maya Fadeeva)
 2021 – "Scat"
 2021 – "Mr. Rain"
 2021 – "Coming a Little Bit Closer"
 2021 – "Playing on the Radio"

References

External links 
Official website
ChinChin Records

Electro swing musicians
Lounge music groups
Nu jazz musicians
German jazz ensembles
Musical groups from North Rhine-Westphalia
Musicians from Wuppertal
Vocal jazz ensembles
Musical groups established in 2002